Nikolaos "Nikos" Papanikolaou (Greek: Νικόλαος "Νίκος" Παπανικολάου; born June 1, 1985) is a Greek professional basketball player for Psychiko of the Greek A2 Basket League. He is a 6 ft 10  in (2.09 m) tall power forward-center.

Professional career
Some of the clubs that Papanikolaou has played with during his pro career include: AEK Athens, Ilysiakos, Rethymno Aegean, Panelefsiniakos, and Psychiko.

National team career
Papanikolaou was a member of the junior national teams of Greece. With Greece's junior national teams, he played at the 2001 FIBA Europe Under-16 Championship and the 2004 FIBA Europe Under-20 Championship. Papanikolaou won the silver medal at the 2009 Mediterranean Games, with the Greek under-26 national team.

References

External links
Euroleague.net Profile
FIBA Archive Profile
Basketball-Reference.com Profile
Profile at Eurobasket.com
Greek Basket League Profile 
Hellenic Federation Profile 
RealGM.com Profile

1985 births
Living people
AEK B.C. players
Competitors at the 2009 Mediterranean Games
Greek men's basketball players
Greek Basket League players
Holargos B.C. players
Ilysiakos B.C. players
Mediterranean Games medalists in basketball
Mediterranean Games silver medalists for Greece
Panelefsiniakos B.C. players
Power forwards (basketball)
Psychiko B.C. players
Rethymno B.C. players
People from Rhodes